The 1938-39 season in Swedish football, starting August 1938 and ending July 1939:

Honours

Official titles

Competitions

Promotions, relegations and qualifications

Promotions

League transfers

Relegations

Domestic results

Allsvenskan 1938–39

Allsvenskan promotion play-off 1938–39

Division 2 Norra 1938–39

Division 2 Östra 1938–39

Division 2 Västra 1938–39

Division 2 Södra 1938–39

Division 2 promotion play-off 1938–39

Norrländska Mästerskapet 1939 
Final

National team results 

 Sweden: 

 Sweden: 

 Sweden: 

 Sweden: 

 Sweden: 

 Sweden: 

 Sweden:

National team players in season 1938/39

Notes

References 
Print

Online

 
Seasons in Swedish football